Dieter Kolb (born c. 1967) is a German curler, curling coach and sport manager.

He participated in the demonstration curling events at the 1988 Winter Olympics, where the German team finished in seventh place.

As a coach of German national women team he participated at the 2002 Winter Olympics.

From 2004 to 2015 he was a president of German Curling Association (Deutscher Curling Verband, DCV). From 2000 to 2006 he was a vice-president of European Curling Federation.

Teams

Record as a coach of national teams

References

External links

 
 
 

1967 births
Living people
German male curlers
Curlers at the 1988 Winter Olympics
Olympic curlers of Germany
German curling coaches
German sports executives and administrators
Place of birth missing (living people)
20th-century German people